Alectryon may refer to:

Alectryon (mythology)
Alector, father of one of the Argonauts, referred to by Homer as "Alectryon"
Alectryon (plant), a genus of plants in the family Sapindaceae